Helianthus smithii is a rare North American species of sunflower known by the common name Smith's sunflower. It is native to the southeastern United States, in Tennessee, Alabama, and Georgia.

Helianthus smithii grows in wet, mucky soils in marshes, ditches, and roadsides. It is a perennial herb up to 260 cm (over 8 feet) tall, spreading by means of underground rhizomes. One plant usually produces 1-15 flower heads, each containing 12–23 yellow ray florets surrounding 100 or more red, yellow, or brown disc florets.

The oldest name for this plant is Helianthus parviflorus var. attenuatus, coined in 1884. Heiser much later wanted to elevate the group to the rank of species, but could not use the name Helianthus attenuatus  because it had already been used in 1929 for a plant from New Mexico. He chose to name it for two botanists, both having a hand in the history of the species, John Donnell Smith and Dale Metz Smith.

References

External links
Alabama Plant Atlas

smithii
Flora of the Southeastern United States
Plants described in 1841
Flora without expected TNC conservation status